The role of active consultant, or simply consultant, in the Philippine Basketball Association (PBA) is the highest coaching role a foreign citizen could normally get in the top-flight professional basketball league due to the head coach role being restricted to Filipino citizens. This is due to a Court of Appeals ruling secured by the Basketball Coaches Association of the Philippines in 2002 barring non-resident foreigners from the head coach's role in the PBA. The employment of consultants by teams of the PBA has been viewed as a "loophole" to this ruling.

Background
The role of head coach is generally restricted to Filipino citizens due to the efforts of the Basketball Coaches Association of the Philippines (BCAP), an association of local Filipino coaches. The BCAP has historically opposed the practice of hiring foreigners through the Philippine's legal system. The BCAP often cites, Article 40 of the Labor Code as argument for their position that foreigners should be restricted from being hired as head coaches since Filipino coaches were deemed capable of fulfilling the head coach role.

The ruling on employing of foreigners as PBA head coaches has been laid as early as 1990. The BCAP in the early 1990s opposed the appointment of Tim Cone as head coach of the Alaska Aces. Cone, who has been a resident of the Philippines since he was nine years old but at the time has yet to marry his Filipino wife and secure permanent residency, had his 1989-issued work permit revoked in 1991.

Foreigners have served as consultants or advisors to Filipino head coaches in the Philippine Basketball Association (PBA) such as Ron Jacobs with San Miguel in the late 1990s, Rajko Toroman for Petron, and Todd Purves with the San Miguel Beermen.

In 2002, BCAP secured a favorable ruling from the Court of Appeals (CA) in regards to their position of hiring foreign coaches under Article 40 of the Labor Code. The CA ruling became final and executory after it went unchallenged in the Supreme Court.

The BCAP in the past has insisted that the ruling also include college basketball such as the UAAP although it has clarified that the ruling doesn't include the head coach role in the Philippine national team due to its "temporary" nature.

The role is not restricted to foreigners. Caloy Garcia, a Filipino took the role of active consultant for Rain and Shine after serving as head coach for the team. Chot Reyes took the role of senior consultant for the TNT Tropang Giga's campaign in the 2023 PBA Governors' Cup so he could focus more on coaching the Philippine national team.

Role
The consultant role in theory serves as an advisor to the head coach, a position which is usually reserved for Filipino citizens, by imparting their coaching experience. In practice, they could play a big role in leading the team during actual games. They are duties that a consultant could not make such as speaking in behalf of the team during press conferences which is done by the head coach.

Foreigners working as consultants need to secure a working permit from the Department of Labor and Employment.

Head coach eligibility for foreigners
The Basketball Coaches Association of the Philippines (BCAP) has laid out exemptions on the prohibition of PBA teams hiring foreigners as head coaches. The coach association has said that they won't oppose the hiring of foreigners as head coaches, who they deem have "enough experience and knowledge", which they could impart to local coaches under a "transfer of technology" set-up. Coaches who reportedly satisfy this conditions include:

Former coaches of NBA teams
Former coaches of NCAA Division I teams who have brought their side to the Final Four.

Foreigners with permanent residency are likewise exempted from the head coach restriction on foreign nationals. Such is the case for Ron Jacobs, Tim Cone, and Norman Black after they have married Filipino nationals.

Notable consultants
 Rajko Toroman – Barako Bull Energy (2013)
 Todd Purves – Petron Blaze Boosters / San Miguel Beermen (2013–2015)
 Mark Dickel – TNT Katropa / TNT Tropang Giga (2018–2020)
 Caloy Garcia – Rain or Shine Elasto Painters (2021–)

References

Philippine Basketball Association
Employment of foreign-born
Expatriate sports coaches
Education and training occupations
Consulting occupations
Sports occupations and roles